Ghamrah is a village in Jizan Province, in south-western Saudi Arabia. During the Islamic Prophet Muhammad's era the Expedition of Ukasha bin Al-Mihsan took place here.

See also

 List of cities and towns in Saudi Arabia
 Regions of Saudi Arabia

See also

List of battles of Muhammad

References

Populated places in Jizan Province